Angama Mara Airport  is a small airport near Angama Mara in Narok County, Kenya.  The airport serves the local areas of the Maasai Mara, national park and nature reserve. The airport was formerly known as Angama Mara Airstrip. In August 2021, the Kenya Airports Authority (KAA) began phased improvements and expansion to convert it to a fully fledged airport.

Location
The geographical coordinates of this airport are 01°16'18.0"S, 34°57'38.0"E (Latitude:-1.271667; Longitude:34.960556).

Overview
It is expected that after the current three-phase upgrade and improvements, the airport can accommodate direct international flights, becoming the fifth international airport in he country.

Upgrade to Airport status
The main objective for he improvements and upgrade is to enable the airport accommodate larger aircraft, (code C aircraft), enabling foreign tourist direct access, increasing tourism and trade.

Other infrastructure developments in Phase One include the construction of a perimeter fence and a new airport apron.

Other considerations
The improvement and upgrade of Angama Mara Airport is part of a project to upgrade six airstrips, including Angama Mara Airport in Narok County and Lanet Airport in Nakuru County, where the scope of work was almost 12 percent complete as of August 29021. A total of KSh691 million (approx. US$6.4 million), was set aside in 2018 by KAA, for his purpose.

See also
 List of airports in Kenya
 Maasai Mara

References

External links
Website of Agama Mara Resort Near This Airport

Airports in Kenya
Narok County